Pseudocurimata is a genus of toothless characins found in tropical South America, with these currently described species:
 Pseudocurimata boehlkei Vari, 1989
 Pseudocurimata boulengeri (C. H. Eigenmann, 1907)
 Pseudocurimata lineopunctata (Boulenger, 1911)
 Pseudocurimata  (C. H. Eigenmann, 1914)
 Pseudocurimata peruana (C. H. Eigenmann, 1922)
 Pseudocurimata troschelii (Günther, 1860)

References
 

Curimatidae
Taxa named by Augustín Fernández-Yépez
Fish of South America